Kara Patria Constantino David-Cancio (born September 12, 1973) is a Filipino journalist, host, professor, and educational administrator.
She is known because of investigative and multi-awarded documentaries in i-Witness. These documentaries are "Bitay, “Selda Inosente”, "Buto't Balat", and Ambulansiyang de Paa.

She is the previous anchor of News to Go as well as a host and writer for i-Witness at GMA Network. She became the host of Powerhouse and is currently the host of  Brigada and Pinas Sarap. In addition, she is a professor at the University of the Philippines-Diliman. She has a TikTok account  and YouTube channel  to share her knowledge in Journalism and other things.

She is the founder and president of Project Malasakit, a foundation that helps the people she has featured in her documentaries.

David was the only woman named in 2007's Ten Outstanding Young Men (TOYM) award. In 2010, she was awarded the Outstanding Women in the Nation's Service (TOWNS award). David won the Peabody Award, the second Filipino to win this award.

Biography
Kara Patria Constantino David was born to Professor Emeritus Randy David of the University of the Philippines Diliman and former Chairperson of the Civil Service Commission, the late Karina Constantino-David.

She graduated cum laude from the University of the Philippines Diliman with the degree of Bachelor of Arts in Broadcast Communication. She then worked as a production assistant and researcher for GMA Network in 1995. She was promoted as writer/researcher for the program “Emergency” and hosted “Huling Hirit”, a regular two-minute segment in the daily news doing adventure-oriented and inspiring features.

David also hosted several public affairs programs such as Case Unclosed, a documentary program that investigates unsolved cases and mysteries. She hosted OFW Diaries, a public service program that reaches out to Filipino overseas workers. She is the news anchor of News to Go, a former morning news program on GMA News TV.She hosted of the informative show Pinas Sarap.

She replaced Jessica Soho as the host of Brigada on June 11, 2019.

On June 30, 2022, it was announced that David will be heading the Department of Journalism of the University of the Philippines Diliman College of Mass Communication as its chairperson.

Documentary films
David has almost a hundred documentaries to her name. In “Bitay” she helped stop the execution of a convict on death row. For this, she was honored as Investigative Journalist of the Year by the Rotary Club of Manila. In the documentary “Selda Inosente”, David entered the world of children born and raised in prison. The film won her the UNICEF Child Rights Award, besting more than a hundred entries from all over the world.

In Buto’t Balat, she explored the state of malnutrition in the country and the reality that extreme inequalities and the absence of concrete and cohesive nutrition and population policy have resulted in a state not far from what occurs in Africa. For this documentary, she was chosen as one of twenty finalists for the Japan Prize. She won a silver medal at the US International Film & Video Festival.

Ambulansiyang de Paa is about the lack of access to health services of the Mangyan tribe, who live in Mindoro Oriental. David documented the plight of the Mangyans, who have to carry their sick in hammocks for eight hours just to get to the nearest hospital. This documentary won the Peabody Award. David is the second Filipino to win this recognition.

In 2007, David was chosen as one of the Outstanding Young Men (TOYM) of the country and was honored as Broadcast Journalist of the Year. In 2011, she was chosen as one of the Ten Outstanding Women in the Nation's Service (TOWNS).

Project Malasakit
In 2002, David founded Project Malasakit – a non-stock non-profit foundation that sends poor Filipino children to school.

It embarks on community outreach programs that give food, medicine, and school supplies to remote communities that do not have access to basic government service. Project Malasakit now has 25 scholars (most of them child laborers and victims of child abuse). It has helped more than 800 families through its quarterly outreach programs. David has also embarked on long-term projects for communities. 

Paraisong Uhaw, her documentary on waterless communities in Masbate, has led to the construction of 10 water wells in the municipality of Balud. David and her Project Malasakit team also constructed a sustainable solar power facility in a community of Mangyans in Mindoro Province

Accolades

International awards

Local awards

References

External links
Project Malasakit
Kara David profile, GMA News Online
Kara David blogsite

1973 births
Living people
Filipino television journalists
People from Guagua
People from Capiz
Visayan people
University of the Philippines Diliman alumni
GMA Network personalities
GMA Integrated News and Public Affairs people
Peabody Award winners